This City are an English nu rave and emo band from Brighton. Original drummer Jason Adelinia left to join the Pipettes in 2007 prior to a profile by The Guardian's Paul Lester. The band played Latitude Festival 2008, Redfest 2008, and supported the band "A"'s 10-date UK tour in December 2009.

They appeared on Orange unsignedAct.

References-

External links
Interview with XYZ Magazine

2006 in music
2006 establishments in England
2010 disestablishments in England
British emo musical groups
Musical groups from Brighton and Hove